Caroline Zhao Zhang (born May 20, 1993) is an American figure skater. She is a two-time (2010 and 2012) Four Continents bronze medalist, the 2007 World Junior Champion, the 2006 Junior Grand Prix Final champion, and a three-time U.S. national medalist (bronze in 2009, pewter in 2008 and 2012).

Personal life
Caroline Zhang was born on May 20, 1993 in Boston, Massachusetts. Her parents are from Wuhan, China, and her older sister, Yang Yang, was born in China. Caroline is bilingual in English and Mandarin. The Chinese media refers to her by her Chinese given name, Yuanyuan (which means "round-round"). She moved to California at a young age. The Zhang family lives in Brea, California.

Zhang is proficient at the piano, was concert master in her middle school's orchestra on violin, and was a ballet dancer before switching to figure skating.

In April 2016, she became engaged to fellow figure skater Grant Hochstein. They married on August 18, 2018. As of February 2017, she is a student at Cerritos College in California.

On April 19, 2021, Zhang gave birth to a daughter, Charlotte Grace Hochstein.

Career

Early career
Zhang started taking skating lessons at age five.

In the 2002–03 season, Caroline Zhang skated on the juvenile level, which is the lowest qualifying level in the United States. Zhang began her season by winning the silver medal at her regional championship to qualify for the 2003 U.S. Junior Championships. There she won the pewter medal (fourth place), juvenile level.

In the 2003–04 season, Zhang moved up to the intermediate level, which is one level up from juvenile. Zhang won her regional championship, which qualified her for a second time for the U.S. Junior Championships, this time at the intermediate level. She won the bronze medal.

In the 2004–05 season, Zhang moved up to the novice level, which was the first level then included at the U.S. Figure Skating Championships. Zhang won the silver medal at her regional championship to qualify for her sectional championship, where she won the pewter medal. At her first U.S. Championships, she won the novice pewter medal.

Li Mingzhu became her coach in 2005. Zhang moved up to the junior level in the 2005–06 season. She won the silver medal at her regional championship to qualify for her sectional championship, where she won the bronze medal. This medal qualified her to compete on the junior level at the 2006 U.S. Championships, where she placed 8th at the age of twelve.

2006–07 season
Zhang made her debut on the international stage in the 2006–07 season. She competed on the 2006–07 ISU Junior Grand Prix and won her first event in Mexico by a record fifty-three points. She went on to win her second event by thirty-three points and then the Junior Grand Prix Final by twenty. Zhang became known for her creative spin positions, musicality and spiral extension, prompting comparisons to Sasha Cohen and Michelle Kwan by those in the figure skating community, including international judge Joe Inman.

Qualifying for the Junior Grand Prix Final qualified her for the 2007 U.S. Championships without having to qualify through her regional or sectional championships. Competing on the Junior level, Zhang won the silver medal behind Mirai Nagasu. Zhang was named to the U.S. team to the 2007 World Junior Championships, where she beat Nagasu to win the title. Zhang, Nagasu, and Ashley Wagner completed the first ever sweep by the United States of the World Junior ladies podium.

2007–08 season

For the 2007–08 season, Zhang moved up to the senior level both nationally and internationally. She made her Grand Prix of Figure Skating debut at the 2007 Skate America, where she won the bronze medal. At this competition, she earned a level 4 and a +3 Grade of Execution for her trademark Pearl spin, which is the highest score a skater can receive under Code of Points. Zhang received deductions for underrotating jumps, costing her 17 points overall. Zhang went on to the 2007 Cup of China, where she received fewer deductions and won the silver medal. She earned 24 qualification points in the Grand Prix series. Following the result of 2007 NHK Trophy, she qualified for the Grand Prix Final, where she placed 2nd in the short program and fourth overall. She was the fourth World Junior Champion in a row to qualify for the Grand Prix Final in her first Grand Prix season.

Zhang had a bye through her regional championship due to Skate America and a bye through her sectional championship due to Cup of China. She made her senior national debut at the 2008 U.S. Championships, where she won the pewter medal. Zhang was placed on the U.S. team for the 2008 World Junior Championships, where she won the silver medal behind Rachael Flatt. With Mirai Nagasu taking the bronze, this was the second ever U.S. sweep of the World Juniors ladies podium.

2008–09 season
In the 2008–09 season, Zhang competed for the second consecutive season on the Grand Prix. At her first event, the 2008 Skate Canada International, she placed third in the short program with a score of 53.28 after falling on her opening jump combination. She placed 5th in the free skate with a score of 97.52, after falling on one jump and omitting another, to place 5th overall. At the 2008 Trophée Eric Bompard, her second Grand Prix assignment, Zhang placed third in the short program with a score of 51.76 after omitting the required double Axel as well as receiving a Level 1 on her spiral sequence. Zhang scored 104.78 in the long program after receiving a downgrade on her triple flip-triple toe combination, as well as a deduction for a wrong edge take-off on her triple Lutz-double toe. She earned a Level 4 on all three of her spins and her spiral sequence. She scored 156.54 overall and won the bronze medal.

At the 2009 U.S. Championships, Zhang won the bronze medal, moving up one position from the previous year. She was placed on the teams to the 2009 Four Continents Championships and the 2009 World Junior Championships. She made her senior ISU Championships debut at the Four Continents Championships, where she placed 4th. She won the silver medal at the World Junior Championships.

On June 15, 2009, Zhang announced a coaching change to Charlene Wong. She returned to Li in August 2009.

2009–10 season
Zhang was assigned to the 2009 Trophée Eric Bompard and to the 2009 Skate Canada International for the 2009–2010 Grand Prix Series. She placed 4th at the 2009 Trophée Eric Bompard with a score of 153.15 points and eighth at the 2009 Skate Canada where she earned 132.46.

At the 2010 U.S. Championships, Zhang placed 11th in the short program with 49.94 points after having problems with her jump combination and falling in her triple loop. She failed to improve her position in the free skate after falling on the triple flip-triple toe combination and stepping out of the triple Lutz. Her final score was 138.27 points.

She was assigned to compete at the 2010 Four Continents. She placed 5th in the short program with a score of 55.10 points after the triple flip in her triple flip-double toe loop combination was downgraded. In the free skate, she completed five triple jumps and earned level fours on all her spins and her spiral sequence to earn 105.68 points. Zhang placed 3rd in the free skate and won the bronze medal overall with 160.78 points.

On July 20, 2010, Zhang announced a coaching change to Tammy Gambill.

2010–11 season
For the 2010–11 ISU Grand Prix season, Zhang was assigned to the 2010 NHK Trophy and the 2010 Skate America. She placed 7th in the 2010 NHK Trophy with 133.86 points and 9th at the 2010 Skate America with 132.49. Zhang competed at the 2011 US Nationals and finished 12th with an overall score of 140.95.

In January 2011, Zhang began training with Peter Oppegard.

2011–12 season
Zhang worked on a triple loop-triple loop combination for the season. Zhang began her season at 2011 Skate America placed third in the short program with 55.05 points. In the long program she placed 10 with a score of 85.65 and finished 6th overall with 140.70 points. She then competed at a senior B event 2011 Ice Challenge where she finish first in the short program with a score of 52.82. In the long program she placed second with 99.90 points however, she finished first with 152.72. Zhang competed at the 2012 U.S. Nationals and finished 4th in the short program with 60.18, in the long program she placed third with 113.01. At the 2012 United States Figure Skating Championships Zhang placed fourth overall with 173.19. She then went on to compete at the 2012 Four Continents Championships where she placed fourth in the short program with 58.74 after she fell out of her triple loop-triple loop combination. In the long program Zhang placed third with a score of 117.44. Overall Zhang moved up to third with a total of 176.18 points and won her second bronze medal at the event.

2012–13 season
Zhang began her international season at the 2012 Nebelhorn Trophy, where she finished 12th overall. She finished 9th at the 2012 Skate Canada and 10th at the 2012 Rostelecom Cup. At the 2013 U.S. Championships, Zhang placed 12th in the short, 9th in the long, and 11th overall. Her triple loop, triple loop combination was scored as under-rotated and downgraded, a decision with which her coach disagreed.

2013–14 season
Zhang was assigned to one 2013–14 ISU Grand Prix at the 2013 Skate America where she finished 10th with an overall score of 110.12 points. After the event, she began to self-coach, saying that she did not want her coach to feel responsible when she skated poorly. She trains in Artesia, California at the East West Ice Palace, an ice rink owned by the Kwan family.

Zhang finished 19th at the 2014 U.S. Championships.

2014–15 season
Zhang began her season by finishing 3rd at the Southwest Pacific Regionals. She then went on to place 4th at the Pacific Coast Sectionals. This result qualified her to compete at the 2015 U.S. Figure Skating Championships where she finished 17th after placing 13th in the short program with a score of 55.40 and 19th in the freeskate with a score of 88.60, and a total score of 144.00.

2015–16 season
In order to correct congenital hip dysplasia, Zhang underwent periacetabular osteotomy   on March 3, 2015 and was able to resume skating in spring 2016. Due to her recovery, she did not compete in the 2015–16 season. She said that her goal was to compete at the 2017 U.S. Championships.

2016–17 season
Caroline Zhang finished third at the Glacier Falls summer competition and first at the Golden West Championships summer competition. She placed 5th at the 2017 U.S. Championships, coached by Oppegard in Artesia, California.

Innovative moves

Zhang has performed a spin position that her mother has called the Pearl spin, a cross between a catch-foot layback spin and a Biellmann spin. In this spin, the free leg is brought up to waist-height and the free blade is grasped with both hands. The back and head are bent down towards the knee, with the free leg held above the head in a Biellmann position. This makes the spin, in essence, a catch-foot layback in a Biellmann position, because the Biellmann position, according to regulations, is achieved when the level of the boot passes the head so that the boot is above and behind or over the head. It is a layback spin because it is an upright spin with the head and shoulders dropped backwards and the back arched downwards toward the ice. This position has become Zhang's signature spin.

Zhang also performs a hyper-extended Biellmann spin. She is one of several young skaters to perform this move. In this variation, the leg is pulled straight up in the air and the back bent as far into the spin as possible. Zhang is able to perform the spin with her free leg pulled straight up into the air, with very little knee bend, making the spin look closer to a capital-I position than the usual Biellmann teardrop shape. She has received a straight +3.00 grade of execution for her layback spin.

Programs

Competitive highlights
GP: Grand Prix; CS: Challenger Series; JGP: Junior Grand Prix

Detailed results

 * 1st after the qualifying round.
 Personal bests highlighted in bold.
 SP = Short program, FS = Free skating, FP = Factored placements

References

External links

 
 

! colspan="3" style="border-top: 5px solid #78FF78;" |Historical World Junior Record Holders (before season 2018–19)

1993 births
Living people
American female single skaters
People from Brea, California
People from Irvine, California
Figure skaters from Boston
American sportswomen of Chinese descent
Four Continents Figure Skating Championships medalists
World Junior Figure Skating Championships medalists
21st-century American women